Archimede is the French and Italian form of  Archimedes. It may also refer to:

People
 Archimede Fusillo (born 1962), an Australian writer
 Archimede Morleo (born 1983), an Italian association football player
 Archimede Nardi (born 1916), an Italian association football player
 Archimede Vestri (1846–1904), an Italian architect
 Gerty Archimède (1909–1980), a French politician
 Luther Archimède (born 1999), a Guadeloupean association football player
 Félix Archimède Pouchet (1800–1872), a French naturalist

Navy
 Archimède, a deep submergence vehicle (bathyscaphe) of the French Navy
 Archimede-class submarine, a 1930s submarine class of the Italian Navy, includes: 
 Italian submarine Archimede (1933), an Archimede-class submarine launched in 1933 and transferred to the Spanish Navy in 1937
 French submarine Archimède,  one of two submarines by this name
 Italian submarine Archimede (1939), a Brin-class submarine launched in 1939 and sunk in 1943

Other uses
 Archimede combined cycle power plant, a solar thermal field in Sicily, Italy
 Archimede construction systems are construction techniques achieving rhombic dodecahedral shapes, a space-filling geometry
 Archimède (band), a French rock band
 Archimede (watches), a German watch brand
 Archimede (company), an Italian film production company
 Archimède le clochard, a 1959 French drama film by Gilles Grangier
 Il piccolo Archimede, a 1979 Italian comedy-drama film by Gianni Amelio

See also
 Archimedes (disambiguation)